Frederick 'Fred' Robert Beart (6 July 1850 – 4 March 1895) was an English first-class cricketer and British Army officer.

The son of Robert Beart, a brick and tile manufacturer, he was born at Godmanchester in July 1850. He was educated at Marlborough College, before going up to Wadham College, Oxford. While studying at Oxford, Beart made a single appearance in first-class cricket for Oxford University against the Marylebone Cricket Club at Oxford in 1871. Batting once in the match, he was dismissed without scoring in the Oxford first-innings by Frank Farrands. After graduating from Oxford, he was commissioned as a lieutenant in the Huntingdon Militia. He was promoted to captain in March 1880 and the following year in July he was appointed as a justice of the peace for Huntingdonshire. By 1886, Beart was serving with the King's Royal Rifle Corps and in April of that year he was promoted to major. He died at Godmanchester in March 1895. His son, Charles, also played first-class cricket.

References

External links

1850 births
1895 deaths
People from Godmanchester
People educated at Marlborough College
Alumni of Wadham College, Oxford
English cricketers
Oxford University cricketers
English justices of the peace
King's Royal Rifle Corps officers